Page One – Sings a Collection of Her Most Famous Songs is a Patti Page LP album, issued by Mercury Records as catalog number MG-20095 in 1957.

This was the first album in a series of four, titled "Page 1" to "Page 4".  Billboard liked this one saying (inter alia): "Mercury has a good nostalgic album series idea, with Patti Page apparently destined to cut a group of albums dedicated to songs of various decades. “Page 1” spotlights  the canary’s warm show-wise vocal talents on tunes from the 1930s… Strong sales prospects for this one, and a potent ‘must’ for jocks."

Track listing

References

1957 compilation albums
Patti Page albums
Mercury Records compilation albums